The Hualapai Mountains are a mountain range located in Mohave County, east of Kingman, Arizona. Rising up to 8,417 feet at its highest peak, the higher elevations of the Hualapai Mountains support Madrean Sky Island habitats, and are host to a plethora of unique flora and fauna in a wide range of microclimates, high above the surrounding Mojave Desert.

Etymology 

Pronounced: "wah-lah-pie"

Meaning of "Hualapai" in Hualapai language: "People of the tall Pines".

English spelling: Walapai

Spanish spelling: Hualapai

Most used spelling: Hualapai, though both are acceptable

Other names for Hualapai Mountain:

Mojave language: Amat 'Avii Kahuwaaly

Geography

The Hualapai Mountain range is located in the central portion of the Basin and Range Province of the southwestern United States, and along the western-most extension of the Arizona Transition Zone (or "Central Highlands" of Arizona).

Summits

The most notable peaks in the Hualapai Mountain Range include:

Hualapai Peak

() is the highest peak in the range, as well as the highest point in Mohave County.

Hayden Peak
() is the second highest peak in the range, and is the site of a communications tower, which is gated and is not accessible to the public.

Aspen Peak
() is among the most visited of the 8,000-foot peaks in the range, and is located within the Hualapai Mountain County Park. Small stands of quaking aspen grow near its summit, giving the upper portion of the mountain an autumn display amidst a sea of tall evergreens.

Dean Peak
() is the northern-most of the notable peaks in this range, and is named after the Dean Mine and its discoverer William Dean. who discovered rich gold and silver-sulfide ore there.

Wabayuma Peak

() is located in the southern portion of the range, and is in the boundary of the Wabayuma Peak Wilderness Area, consisting of 40,000 acres managed by the Bureau of Land Management Kingman Field Office.

Other notable peaks 

Getz Peak is located directly to the north of the Hualapai County Park Ranger Station, and is the site of multiple communications towers, which are also gated, and not accessible to the public.

Watershed tributaries

The Hualapai Mountain range extends into both the Upper and Lower Colorado River Basin watersheds.
 North-western flanks of the range flow into the Hualapai Valley (Hualapai Wash), north to Lake Mead.
 Southwest flanks flow into Sacramento Valley (Sacramento Wash), flowing south to the Colorado River crossing at Topock, AZ.
 Eastern flanks of the mountain flow into the Big Sandy River valley which makes a long journey south to Alamo Lake before travelling west along the Bill Williams River and into the southern portion of Lake Havasu near Parker Dam.

Ecology

Flora

The Hualapai Mountains contain a dramatic range of plant communities depending on the elevation, slope direction, and microclimate conditions of a given area.
 These lists are not a complete archive of plant species in these plant communities, but demonstrate the dominant plant varieties which are characteristic to the landscape. Plants List Source:

Desert/xeric shrublands

 

This list includes plant species which are native and predominant throughout the environment in and around the Hualapai Mountain foothills:
 creosote bush
 palo verde
 mesquite
 beaver-tail cactus
 saguaro cactus
 barrel cactus
 cholla (jumping) cactus
 various species of yucca
 agave
 whitehorn
 bur-sage
 cat's claw
 crucifixion thorn
 a variety of perennial grasses

Grasslands

The most prominent grassland communities in the area are found on the east side of the range, across Big Sandy River Valley up to the foot of the Hualapai Mountains. Dominant species of perennial grass may include:
 "blue", "black", "hairy", and "side-oats" grama (Yes, you read that properly.)
 tobosa
 ring muhly
 three-awn

Interior chapparel scrubland

A landscape that is dominated by short, woody shrubs, especially on south-facing mountain slopes, and areas which are recovering from wildfires. This plant community makes up the buffer between the harsh desert below and the fragile forest-environments above.

May include the following plant varieties/species:
 scrub oak
 manzanita
 silk tassle
 Apache plume
 cat's claw
 sparse, intermixed juniper
 cliffrose
 Grass and other ground-cover plants may be found in some varying quantities, but are generally less prominent in this plant community.

Piñon-Juniper woodlands

Pinyon-juniper woodlands are nurse plants of ecological facilitation between chapparel scrubland and forested environments at higher elevations. Juniper tends to be more predominant at lower elevations, while Piñon Pine grow more vigorously at slightly higher elevations.

Other flora varieties of this plant community may include:
 winterfat
 cliffrose
 silktassel
 goldenrod
 snakeweed
 threadleaf groundsel
 Mixed perennial grass in limited quantities. As the conifer stands develop their canopy, grass and other low-lying herbaceous plants are gradually smothered.

Mountain conifer forest

5000+ feet

Tall pines and thick stands of broad-leaved trees constitute the montane conifer forests in the upper elevations of the Hualapai Mountains.

Trees include:
 ponderosa pine
 gambel oak
 Arizona walnut
 (quaking) aspen
 douglas fir
 white fir.

Grasses may include:
 blue grama
 western wheatgrass
 sheep fescue
 Arizona fescue
 mountain and screwleaf muhly
 junegrass
 muttongrass
 sedges

Wildlife

Black bear, elk, mule deer, mountain lion, javelina, and other animals can be found here. Mountain lion and bear have been drawn to civilized areas like Pinion Pines and Atherton Acres due to the large deer population, though bear sightings are very uncommon. There are some animals only native to the Hualapai Mountain range, including a breed of ground squirrel, and tarantula.

Geology

History

Points of interest and activities

Hualapai Mountain County Park

The area that is now Hualapai Mountain Park was first developed in the 1930s by the Civilian Conservation Corps (CCC), and is, today, managed by the Mohave County Parks department. Hualapai Peak is located south of the Mohave County Park boundary on Bureau of Land Management land.

The park has cabins, recreation areas, dry camping campsites, and hook-up spots for recreational vehicles, and is generally open year-round for camping and recreation. There are signs telling the history, varieties of vegetation, local and migratory birds, and other wildlife which can be spotted around the park.

Pine Lake Valley

Near the end of Hualapai Mountain Road, just past the Hualapai Mountain Park ranger station, is a community known as Pine Lake. The lake itself, for which the valley gets its name, is privately owned, and is not available to the public, however, it is viewable from a number of high points surrounding the valley, namely along Flag Mine Road, as well as Ponderosa Drive, the public access route to the county "Fuels Management" area (community burn-pile).

Some basic amenities, including the Hualapai Mountain Resort (general store, hotel, restaurant, bar, and event center), a volunteer fire department, and some privately owned cabins for rent may be found here.

Wildcow Campground

Accessed from Flag Mine Road, Wild Cow Springs Campground is located on Antelope Wash Road (fire evacuation route). The campground is managed by the Bureau of Land Management, and is a paid site with outhouses and a few bear-proof trashcans, but it is recommended to pack out your garbage if possible.

This site is technically accessible with a 5th wheel or class A motorhome, but comes with its own risks. Contact the Bureau of Land Management Kingman Field Office for road conditions if in doubt.

Off-road trails

From the Pine Lake Community there are a number of dirt roads that lead out into the mountains. There are two main routes in and out of the community, via the Hualapai Mountain Road, and Flag Mine Road (Arizona Peace Trail). Other ATV routes exist, but are not recommended for general through-way travel, or low clearance vehicles.

From Flag Mine Road one can access many different routes along the "Ridge Road" (a piece of the Arizona Peace Trail) of the Hualapai Mountains, which traverses north–south through the various valleys, canyons and washes. There are a number of other routes and trails, including the Moss Wash Basin which is adopted by a local OHV group. At the end of Flag Mine Road is the Boreana Mine, and the route to Yucca.

The main fire evacuation route is generally maintained to allow low clearance vehicles, but most other roads and atv trails will require high clearance and/ or four-wheel drive. There is a designated fire escape route to get out of out the mountains to the east (toward highway 95) in the event of a wildfire that prevents fleeing using the main road (Antelope Wash Road accessed from Flag Mine Road at the BLM Wildcow Campground) Travel at your own risk. A high-quality OHV/Trail map of the Hualapai Mountains and surrounding areas is generally available at the Mohave County Sheriff's Office (search and rescue map).

References

External links
 

Mountain ranges of Mohave County, Arizona
Mountain ranges of the Lower Colorado River Valley
Civilian Conservation Corps in Arizona
Parks in Mohave County, Arizona
Mountain ranges of Arizona